The Examination Yuan is the civil service commission branch, in charge of validating the qualification of civil servants, of the government of the Republic of China (Taiwan). It has a president, a vice president, and seven to nine members, all of whom are nominated by the president of the republic and confirmed by the Legislative Yuan for four-year terms according to Republic of China laws.

Organizational structure

Members composition
The Examination Yuan consists of a council with a president, a vice president, and seven to nine members. The leaders and members are nominated by the president of the republic and approved by Legislative Yuan for four-year terms. The incumbent 13th Examination Yuan was nominated by President Tsai Ing-wen on May 28, 2020, and later confirmed by Legislative Yuan on July 10, 2020. Members were inaugurated on September 1, 2020, and their terms expire on August 31, 2024.

Agencies
The Examination Yuan has four main agencies:
 The Ministry of Examination, which administers examinations for civil servants and contract personnel.
 Ministry of Civil Service, which oversees the pay, promotion, and retirement of civil servants.
 Civil Service Protection and Training Commission, which is responsible for training and protecting the rights of civil servants.
 Public Service Pension Fund Supervisory Board

Offices and committees
The Examination Yuan also includes twelve offices and three committees:
 Counselors
 Secretariat
 First Division
 Second Division
 Third Division
 Editing and Compilation Office
 Information Management Office
 Secretary Office
 Personnel Office
 Accounting Office
 Statistics Office
 Civil Service Ethics Office
 Petition and Appeals Committee
 Legal Affairs Committee
 Research and Development Committee

History

Constitutional theory
The concept of Examination Yuan is a part of the Three Principles of the People formulated by Sun Yat-sen, which was enlightened by the old Imperial examination system used in Imperial China. It is one of the five government branches ("yuans") of the Government of the Republic of China. Practically, it operates like a ministry of the Executive Yuan, though its members may not be removed by the president or premier.

Establishment and relocation to Taiwan

After the end of Northern Expedition in 1928, the Nationalist Government set up the preparatory office of the Examination Yuan in October 1928 in which the organic law was promulgated. In May 1929, the headquarters of the Examination Yuan was inaugurated at Kuankung and Yueh Fei Temple in Nanking. In January 1930, the Examination Yuan and its subordinates Examination Committee and Ministry of Civil Service were formally established. In December 1937, the headquarters was temporarily relocated to Chungking during the Second Sino-Japanese War. After the end of World War II in 1945, the headquarters was moved back to Nanking.

In January 1950, the headquarters were relocated temporarily to Taipei Confucius Temple in Taiwan after the Chinese Civil War. In December 1951, the headquarters were moved to Muzha District, Taipei. In March 1990, the Yuheng Building of the Yuan was inaugurated.

Democratization
During the second revision of the Additional Articles of the Constitution in 1992, confirmation powers of its members were transferred from the Control Yuan to the Legislative Yuan, and articles related to its role as a governing body of mainland China were abolished. In 2019, the Examination Yuan was reduced from 19 members to between 7 and 9, and terms were reduced from 6 years to 4 to coincide with presidential and legislative elections.

There have been calls to abolish the Examination Yuan (and the Control Yuan) by the Democratic Progressive Party (DPP), the Taiwan People's Party (TPP) and New Power Party (NPP). TPP caucus whip Lai Hsiang-ling stated that members of the Examination Yuan hold "fat-cat patronage appointments", whereby they earn outside income on top of their usual salary, including by teaching at universities in mainland China. Additionally, the functions of the Examination Yuan are seen as overlapping with those of the Executive Yuan, and an online poll showed about half of respondents supported its abolishment. President Tsai Ing-wen called for the two Yuans to be abolished at the DPP national congress in 2020; the Kuomintang responded by saying that it was an effort to distract from the DPP's poor leadership, but did not provide their stance on the matter. A constitutional amendment committee was formed in September of 2020 to draft proposals for the abolition of the Examination Yuan.

Terms 
Appointments of the leaders and members of the Examination Yuan were carried out with presidential nomination and parliamentary confirmation. The first through eighth Examination Yuans were all confirmed by the first Control Yuan, whose members first convened in 1948 and had their terms extended indefinitely. During the democratization of Taiwan in the 1990s, a series of constitutional amendments known as the Additional Articles of the Constitution were promulgated to reorganize the government. These amendments changed the Control Yuan from a parliament chamber to a commission-type agency. Confirmation of the Examination Yuan officials was then moved to other parliament chambers to maintain the separation of powers.

Currently, according to the Additional Articles of the Constitution, the Examination Yuan is confirmed by the now-unicameral parliament — the Legislative Yuan.

Presidents and vice presidents of the Examination Yuan

See also 
 Government of the Republic of China
 Politics of the Republic of China
 Civil service commission

References

External links 

 Official site

 
National civil service commissions
Government agencies established in 1930
1930 establishments in China